Ericeia rectimargo is a moth in the  family Erebidae. It is found on New Guinea.

References

Moths described in 1929
Ericeia